In chess, the Greek gift sacrifice, also known as the classical bishop sacrifice, is a typical sacrifice of a bishop by White playing Bxh7+ or Black playing Bxh2+ at some point after the opponent has castled kingside, with the goal generally being to attack and checkmate the opponent's King, or to regain material. It is important to consider the opponent's defenses.
 
Greek gift sacrifices, or the threat of them, occur relatively frequently in play, especially at the lower levels. One of the most famous examples of the sacrifice is found in the game Edgard Colle–John O'Hanlon, Nice 1930. Less commonly, a Greek gift sacrifice may be the prelude to a double bishop sacrifice, as seen in Lasker versus Bauer, Amsterdam, 1889.

Requirements

The Greek gift sacrifice usually requires several requirements in order to succeed. In some positions, not all of them have to be present, but in general the attack will succeed if:
There is a knight on f3 or h3 (which can move to g5 to deliver a check).
White has a queen which can advance to h5 to deliver a check.
No black bishop is able to move to f5, or a black knight to f6. Thus, a pawn on e5 and a black pawn on e6 is often necessary, but not always.
No pawns are obstructing pieces (such as a pawn on g4), though this is not always necessary.
There is a white dark-squared bishop or a rook which can join the attack.
A white pawn on h4 is necessary if there is a black bishop on e7. Otherwise it can be useful, although not necessary.

Illustration

The position after the moves 1.e4 e6 2.d4 d5 3.Nc3 Nf6 4.e5 Nfd7 5.Nf3 Bb4 6.Bd3 0-0 (see diagram) is a simple case where the Greek gift sacrifice works. White can play 7.Bxh7+ Kxh7 8.Ng5+ to force Black to give up the queen to prevent mate:
8...Kh8 9.Qh5+ Kg8 10.Qh7
8...Kg8 9.Qh5 threatening 10.Qh7#, to which the only feasible responses are
9...Qxg5 10.Bxg5 wins the queen, and
9...Re8 10.Qxf7+ Kh8 11.Qh5+ Kg8 12.Qh7+ Kf8 13.Qh8+ Ke7 14.Qxg7#
8...Kh6 9.Nxf7+ wins the queen.
8...Kg6 9.h4 and there is no satisfactory way to meet the threat of 10.h5+ Kh6 (10...Kf5 11.g4#) 11.Nxf7+, winning the queen.

Etymology
The etymology of the phrase "Greek gift" in this context is not entirely clear. The obvious explanation is that it alludes to the Trojan Horse, and specifically to Laocoön's famous Timeo Danaos et dona ferentes ("I fear the Greeks even when they bring gifts", Virgil's Aeneid II.49). The Oxford Companion to Chess, however, suggests that one explanation is that the sacrifice often occurred in Gioachino Greco's games.

References

Further reading
Vladimir Vuković, Art of Attack in Chess – chapter 6 is dedicated to the classical bishop sacrifice

External links
Greek gift practice

Chess tactics